The great ground dove (Pampusana nui) is an extinct species of bird in the family Columbidae.  It was found in Mangaia in the southern Cook Islands, and in French Polynesia where subfossil bones between 1000 and 2000 years old have been found in the Marquesas, as well as between 750 and 1250 years old at the Fa'ahia early occupation site on Huahine in the Society Islands.

Notes

References
 Kirchman, Jeremy J.; & Steadman, David W. (Online publication 2006). New Species of Rails (Aves: Rallidae) From an Archaeological Site on Huahine, Society Islands. Pacific Science 60: 281. 
 Steadman, David W. (1992). New species of Gallicolumba and Macropygia (Aves: Columbidae) from archeological sites in Polynesia. In: Papers in Avian Paleontology Honoring Pierce Brodkorb, ed Jonathan J. Becker Science series Natural History Museum of Los Angeles County, 36 (1992): 329–348.
 Steadman, David W. (2006). Extinction and biogeography of tropical Pacific birds. University of Chicago Press. 
 Steadman, David W.; & Pahlavan, Dominique S. (Online publication 21 December 2006). Extinction and biogeography of birds on huahine, society islands, French Polynesia. Geoarchaeology 7(5): 449–483.

Pampusana
†
†
Extinct birds of Oceania
Late Quaternary prehistoric birds
Holocene extinctions
Huahine
Fossil taxa described in 1992
Birds described in 1992